Diego Deza Tello (died 1579) was a Roman Catholic prelate who served as Bishop of Jaén (1577–1579),
Bishop of Coria (1566–1577),
and Bishop of Islas Canarias (1554–1566).

Biography
Diego Deza Tello was born in Seville, Spain.
On 30 April 1554, he was appointed during the papacy of Pope Julius III as Bishop of Islas Canarias.
On 26 April 1566, he was appointed during the papacy of Pope Pius V as Bishop of Coria.
On 11 September 1577, he was appointed during the papacy of Pope Gregory XIII as Bishop of Jaén.
He served as Bishop of Jaén until his death on 13 September 1579 in Seville, Spain.

References

External links and additional sources
 (for Chronology of Bishops)
 (for Chronology of Bishops)
 (for Chronology of Bishops) 
 (for Chronology of Bishops) 
 (for Chronology of Bishops)
 (for Chronology of Bishops)

16th-century Roman Catholic bishops in Spain
Bishops appointed by Pope Julius III
Bishops appointed by Pope Pius V
Bishops appointed by Pope Gregory XIII
1579 deaths